Tylotropidiopsis is a monotypic genus of grasshoppers in the family Acrididae, containing the species Tylotropidiopsis abrepta, which is endemic to Vietnam. 

The Orthoptera Species File does not include this genus in any subfamily, although some authorities place it in the Eyprepocnemidinae.

References

Acrididae genera
Monotypic Orthoptera genera
Orthoptera of Vietnam
Endemic fauna of Vietnam